Dracula nosferatu  is a species of orchid in the subtribe Pleurothallidinae (family Orchidaceae), native to Antioquia Department, Colombia. An epiphyte found only in a few locales in a degraded cloud forest, it is nonetheless cultivated by Dracula enthusisasts, by cloning.

References

nosferatu
Endemic orchids of Colombia
Plants described in 1989